West Strand Historic District is a national historic district located at Kingston in Ulster County, New York.  The district includes nine contributing buildings.  It comprises a grouping of 19th century commercial buildings.  They are four story buildings generally constructed of brick with storefronts on the first floor.

It was listed on the National Register of Historic Places in 1974.  It is located adjacent to the Rondout-West Strand Historic District, listed on the National Register of Historic Places in 1979.

References

National Register of Historic Places in Ulster County, New York
Historic districts on the National Register of Historic Places in New York (state)
Historic districts in Ulster County, New York